ZOC is a popular computer-based terminal emulator and Telnet software client for the Microsoft Windows and Apple Macintosh macOS operating systems that supports telnet, modem, SSH 1 and 2, ISDN, serial, TAPI, Rlogin and other means of communication. Its terminal emulator supports Xterm emulation with full colors, meta-keys and local printing, VT102, VT220 and several types of ANSI as well as Wyse, TVI, TN3270, and Sun's CDE. It supports full keyboard remapping, scripting in REXX and other languages, and support for named pipes.

ZOC is commercial software developed by Markus Schmidt of EmTec Innovative Software in Germany, a firm which produces software for various aspects of communications via telephone, PC, ISDN and the like.  Price  was about US$80, with a free evaluation period of 30 days; ZOC can be downloaded for evaluation from EmTec or several shareware distribution sites. Emtec produces two other associated but independent telecommunications programmes for use over TCP/IP, modem, ISDN etc.: PyroTrans, an FTP package including client and server, and PyroBatchFTP, a programmable FTP tool.

History 
ZOC was first released for OS/2 in October 1993 (v0.95)  and for Windows in November 1996 (v3.02). In 1997 it was selected as runner-up in the OS/2 e-Zine! Readers' Choice Awards. ZOC released version 3.11 in January 1999. Support for OS/2 was discontinued with the release of version 5. Mac OS X has been supported from version 6.

Features

Protocols 
 Secure Shell (SSH V1/V2) based on OpenSSH 8.1 with public/private key authentication, port forwarding (tunneling) and Smart Card support.
 Telnet (RFC-Telnet, pure TCP sockets, SSL-Telnet)
 modem via serial port and TAPI (Windows modem)
 ISDN via CAPI V2.0 (including X.25 and X.31 support)
 Rlogin
 File transfer protocols: ASCII, X-Modem, Y-Modem, Z-Modem, Kermit, SCP, and SFTP

Terminals emulated 
 Linux (Xterm) console-like
 VT52, VT100, VT102, VT220, VT420, VT520
 ANSI-BBS, ANSI-SCO, Avatar
 IBM like TN3270 and TN5250
 Sun-CDE
 QNX V4
 Wyse 30, 50, 60
 TVI 9xx (TVI 920, TVI 925, TVI 950)
 TTY
 Xterm
 Full support for line graphics when using any font

Automation 
Scripting
 REXX language for scripting (fully featured programming language with over 75 extensions to control the terminal emulator) — a REXX interpreter is supplied with ZOC, and another interpreter can be specified in configuring ZOC
 AppleScript support with access to all internal script commands on macOS
 recorded login scripts, macro commands, automatic replies on incoming text
 DDE supported in Windows version, allowing ZOC to act as a communication server

User interface 
 Tabbed interface for multiple concurrent connections and overview display to show thumbnails of open sessions
 Keys for macros, remappable keyboard, user button bar
 Online chat support
 Configurable display.

See also 
 Comparison of SSH clients

References

External links 
 

Internet Protocol based network software
Terminal emulators
Secure Shell
Rexx
Telnet